In mathematics, the Poincaré–Lelong equation, studied by , is the partial differential equation

on a Kähler manifold, where ρ is a positive (1,1)-form.

References

Complex manifolds
Partial differential equations